Kentucky Handicap is a 1926 American silent action film directed by Harry Joe Brown and starring Reed Howes, Alice Calhoun and Robert McKim. It is also known by the alternative title Kentucky Luck.

Cast
 Reed Howes
 Alice Calhoun
 Robert McKim
 Lydia Knott
 Josef Swickard
 James Bradbury Jr.

References

Bibliography
 Munden, Kenneth White. The American Film Institute Catalog of Motion Pictures Produced in the United States, Part 1. University of California Press, 1997.

External links

1926 films
1920s action films
American action films
American silent feature films
1920s English-language films
Rayart Pictures films
Films directed by Harry Joe Brown
American black-and-white films
1920s American films